Ailhash Union is a union parishad of Alamdanga Upazila, in Chuadanga District, Khulna Division of Bangladesh. There are 17 villages and 11 mouzas in the union.

References

External links
 

Unions of Khulna Division
Unions of Alamdanga Upazila
Unions of Chuadanga District